Serenade of Peaceful Joy, or previously known as Held in the Lonely Castle, is a 2020 Chinese period drama series loosely based on Milan Lady's novel of the same name. It is directed by Zhang Kaizhou, and stars Wang Kai as Emperor Renzong of Song and Jiang Shuying as Empress Cao. The series aired on Hunan TV starting April 7, 2020.

Synopsis 
When Zhao Zhen discovers his biological mother is not the Empress Dowager Liu E, but her maid Li Lanhui, he arranges a marriage between his beloved daughter Princess Fukang and the Li family’s son Li Wei as compensation for his lack of filial piety. In the political arena, Zhao Zhen strives to maintain a balance of power between the conservative and progressive factions after the Qingli reforms experiences a significant backlash from the former.

Inside the palace, Emperor Renzong faces the dutiful Empress Cao, the troublesome Zhang Mihan, and the gentle Lady Miao. As time passes, all of his sons don't survive past childhood and he is left without a male heir.

Outside the palace, Huirou’s married life with Li Wei is far from pleasant – displeased with her foolish and boring husband, and annoyed by her prying in-laws, Huirou develops an even closer relationship with her eunuch Liang Huaiji. After a serious dispute with her husband’s family, Huirou knowingly breaks the law by charging back to the palace the same night with the help of Huaiji.

The next day, conservative official Sima Guang presents a scathing memorial to Zhao Zhen, heavily criticising Huirou for her selfishness and violation of imperial etiquette. Zhao Zhen had always encouraged freedom of speech and supported a supervisory system that would maintain disciplinary surveillance over bureaucrats and royalty, and must ultimately choose between his daughter’s happiness and the stability of government.

Cast

Main

 Wang Kai as Zhao Zhen
 A benevolent and merciful emperor who would bring about one of the most economically and culturally prosperous eras of the Song Dynasty. However, he encounters much backlash from conservative officials while trying to implement the progressive Qingli Reforms.
 Jiang Shuying as Empress Cao
 An empress who abides by her duties but is distrusted by the emperor due to the power her relatives wield in court and because she remains him of the dowager empress.

Supporting

Royal family

 Ren Min as Zhao Huirou
 Zhao Zhen's beloved daughter Princess Fukang. She is unable to deal with the suffocating atmosphere in the Princess manor, where Li resides as well, and develops romantic affection towards her eunuch Huaiji. Refusing to swallow the insults from her in-laws, she charges back to the palace one night with the help of Huaiji, and her rebellious actions lead to an uproar in the government.
 Wu Yue as Liu E
 The dowager Empress and regent of the empire for twelve years. She's the emperor adopted mother. She sincerely loves him but knows their relationship remains cold and cordial.
 Wang Churan as Noble Consort Zhang
 Her real name is Zhang Bihan. She is one of the best dancers in the palace and met Zhao Zhen as a child and fell in love with him ever since - even though the emperor had forgotten. She isn't adjusted to the life of the harem and grows paranoid, convinced that everyone is against her. All of her daughters passed away at a young age, and her mental health is affected greatly. 
 Xu Lingyue as Lady Miao, Noble Consort
 Birth name: Miao He'er. The mother of Zhao Huirou and Zhao Zuigxinglai, and the childhood lover of Zhao Zhen. She only cares about her children's well-being while also developing a rivalry with Zhang Bihan. She's a close friend of the empress.
 Lu Yanqi as Lady Dong
at first a maid named Lantiao. She's responsible for indirectly causing the death of Bihan eldest daughter. She holds a grudge against Nanny Gu and is jealous of her favouritism over Bihan rather than her. However, she ends up reconciling with Nanny Gu who later kill her while pregnant of the emperor child.
 Liu Zihe as Lady Yu
Lady Miao's friend, she despises Zhang Bihan.
 Wang Yuchao as Emperor Yingzong of Song
 Yang Yue as Empress Gao
 an outspoken and fierce woman, she was chosen by the dowager empress to become the empress. She sincerely loves the emperor but her hot-headed temperament leads her to palace tricks and to her deposal. She mysteriously dies shortly after returning to the emperor's good grace.
 Xiao Yifen as Ninth Princess
 Qian Jin as Tenth Princess
 Zhao Da as Zhao Yuanyan
The adopted son of the Empress, a member of the imperial clan. He was Huirou's childhood companion and friend.
 Kang Qunzhi as Princess of Wei
 Lu Xing as Li Wei
 Princess Fukang's husband.

Ministers 

 Yang Le as Han Qi
 Chancellor of Northern Song for a decade, one of the ministers responsible for the Qingli Reforms.
 Yu Entai as Yan Shu
 Renowned poet and calligrapher.
 Liu Jun as Fan Zhongyan
 A politician who advocated for sweeping reforms to the court and political system, and proposed the changes that kickstarted the Qingli Reforms along with Han Qi and Fu Bi.
 Li Yanan as Fu Bi
 Fan Zhongyan as Han Qi's close colleague
 Zhang Benyu as Ouyang Xiu
 Feng Hui as Xia Song
 Tan Xihe as Lü Yijian
 Chen Weidong as Wen Yanbo
 Chu Junchen as Sima Guang
 Ji Chen as Di Qing
 Ding Jiawen as Cao Ping
 He Jianze as Bao Zheng
 Yang Shuo as Shi Jie
 He Minghan as Wang Gongchen
 Zhao Haoyuan as Su Shunqi
 Yu Peishan as Cao Yi

Servants 

 Bian Cheng as Liang Huaiji
 An eunuch who has served the princess since a young age, and develops romantic affection for the princess.
 Ye Zuxin as Zhang Maoze
 Head eunuch. The emperor and empress' close aide. He has an unrequited love for the Empress, but is willing to bury his feelings and simply be a confidante.
 Cao Xiwen as Granny Gu
Zhang Bihan's mother figure, who she cares for like her own daughter, helps her to get out of trouble. Due to her influence on her, she also participates in Bihan's paranoia which set her against the empress and Lady Miao, convinced that they are responsible for Bihan's daughter's death. She later murders Lantiao after realizing that Bihan discovers the truth and kills herself to save her.
 Chu Feng as Ren Shouzhong
 Hu Shuangquan as Liang Quanyi
 Liu Xizi as Zhang Chengzhao
 Zhang Xiaoyue as Xiu Niang
 Wang Xiao as Gu Sanxi

Others 

 Zhang Tian'ai as Chen Xichun
Lady Chen, she was the Emperor's first love, but he sent her away since she was not fit to be Empress
 Guo Hong as Lady Yang
 Li Jiaxin as Fu Ruolan
 Fu Bi's daughter
 Wu Xiaoyu as Xue Yuhu
 Jin Yiying as Jia Qingzi
 Tian Luhan as Huan'er
 Bu Yaping as Cao Ping's wife.
 He Yuxiao as King of Yan's grandson
 Feng Youran as Bi Tao
 Ma Yixun as Yan Jidao
 Hu Haobo as Liang Yuansheng
 Li Peize as Man Jidao
 Hou Mingyao as Xia He

Production
Principal photography commenced on 5 January 2019 at Hengdian World Studios.

Casting 
On 8 November 2018, Wang Kai was announced as the male lead, and the director confirmed that the focus of the drama would be on the emperor's reign, while still keeping the original romance between Princess Huirou and Liang Huaiji intact. On 7 December 2018, the rest of the cast was announced. In May 2019, the drama wrapped up filming and announced guest appearances by several actors.

Original soundtrack 
The Original Soundtrack album (清平乐 电视剧原声带) was released on April 30, 2020, and was produced by Meng Ke and Lu Liang. The compilation album of the drama ending themes (清平乐 电视剧片尾曲合辑) was released on May 1, 2020 and was produced by Dong Yingda.

Ratings 

 Highest ratings are marked in red, lowest ratings are marked in blue

References

External links 
  Held in the Lonely Castle on Weibo 

Television series about China
Television shows based on Chinese novels
Television series by Daylight Entertainment
2020 Chinese television series debuts
Chinese historical television series
Television series set in the Northern Song